Darb-e Astaneh Khalid Ebn Ali (also Romanized as Darb-e Āstāneh Khālid Ebn ʿAlī; also known as Darb-e Āstāneh, Darb Āstāneh, Darreh Suna, and Darreh-ye Sūneh) is a village in Shirvan Rural District, in the Central District of Borujerd County, Lorestan Province, Iran. At the 2006 census, its population was 603, in 148 families.

The region is seismically active. The village was the centre of the 2006 Borujerd earthquake, and was close to the centre of the 1909 Silakhor earthquake, which latter killed 8,000 people.

References 

Towns and villages in Borujerd County